Sandro Bellucci (born 21 February 1955) is a former Italian race walker.

Biography
He won two medals, at senior level, at the International athletics competitions. Heparticipated at two editions of the Summer Olympics (1984 and 1988), he has 31 caps in national team from 1974 to 1991.

Achievements

See also
 Italian all-time lists - 50 km walk

References

External links
 

1955 births
Living people
People from Lanuvio
Italian male racewalkers
Athletes (track and field) at the 1984 Summer Olympics
Athletes (track and field) at the 1988 Summer Olympics
Olympic athletes of Italy
Olympic bronze medalists for Italy
World Athletics Championships athletes for Italy
Medalists at the 1984 Summer Olympics
Olympic bronze medalists in athletics (track and field)
Sportspeople from the Metropolitan City of Rome Capital